In shogi, the Duck or Duck Legs (アヒル ahiru) opening is a surprise Static Rook position characterized by a Duck castle and formation similar to a Double Wing Attack opening that transitions to a Twisting Rook-like position. It is typically used in a Double Static Rook game; however, there is a variation for playing against a Ranging Rook opponent.

The opening may be played by amateurs but is not used by professional players.

Essentially, the opening tries to trade the major pieces to get them in hand in order to drop them within the opponent's camp. Since the Duck castle is defends broadly against major piece drops, this situation can favor the Duck player. Failing the piece exchange, the Duck opening typically aims for an edge attack to break through their opponent's camp.

Against Static Rook

1. P-26 P-84, 2. P-25 P-85. Double Wing opening.

After this, there are two published variations in 湯川 (2015). One has an early floating rook (in the section below) while the other variation has an early peeping bishop (immediately following section).

Early peeping bishop

3. P-96. Protect bishop head indirectly via the edge pawn instead of the more common gold defense. This move allows for the peeping bishop (のぞき角 nozoki kaku) position characteristic of this opening.

3. ...G-22. Gold protects bishop head.

4. B-97. The peeping bishop. White's 53 pawn is now being attacked.

4. ...S-62. White must defend against the attack of Black's peeping bishop. Using their right silver to do this is a natural move since this silver is usually advanced for attack anyway. However, this move allows prevents White from using a direct Climbing Silver offensive.

5. P-24 Px24, 6. Rx24. Black trades his second file pawn in order to get a pawn in hand. 

6. ...P*23. White must protect their bishop head square (23) from Black dropping a pawn there. Dropping a pawn on 23 for this purpose is a standard move in Double Wing openings.

7. R-26. Black retreats their rook to rank 6 in a floating rook position. This floating rook position is necessary in the Duck opening since Black must protect their peeping bishop from an edge attack if White pushes their ninth file pawn (...P-94, ...P-95).

7. ...K-41. White starts castling their king leftward away from their rook.

8. S-68 S-42, 9. S-48 G-52. Black also starts castling first starting with moving both silvers up and toward the center building the legs of the Duck castle. White builds a Crab castle.

10. G-79. Black moves both golds outward creating the Duck feet.

10. ...P-34. White activates their bishop by openings its diagonal.

Black offers a rook trade. A rook trade would be beneficial to Black since their Duck castle has their camp well defended against a rook drop while White's camp has open undefended spaces. Therefore, White should reject the rook trade.

Rejecting rook trade

Edge attack

Accepting rook trade

Early floating rook

3. R-26. In this variation, Black dispenses with an initial rook trade and instead moves their rook into the floating rook (浮き飛車 ukibisha) position on rank 6. (Cf. the initial position of Buoyant Rook.)

Against Ranging Rook

See also

 Static Rook
 Twisting Rook

Bibliography

 
  

Shogi openings
Double Static Rook openings
Static Rook openings
Static Rook vs Ranging Rook openings
Shogi surprise openings